Joseph Dergham (born on 23 April 1930 in Ebrine, Lebanon - died on 28 October 2015) was a Lebanese Maronite Bishop of the Maronite Catholic Eparchy of Cairo.

Life
Joseph Dergham was born in Ebrine, Lebanon. He received his priestly ordination on 12 April 1959.

On 5 April 1989 Pope John Paul II appointed him bishop of the Eparchy of Cairo of the Maronites. His episcopal ordination was on 16 September 1989, and the main consecrator was the Maronite Patriarch of Antioch, Nasrallah Boutros Sfeir; his co-consecrators were Joseph Merhi, Eparch of Cairo and Georges Abi-Saber, Titular bishop of Aradus. Dergham resigned on 18 September 2005 by limite of age and his renounce was accepted by Pope Benedict XVI.

Dergham died on October 28, 2015.

References

External links
 Joseph Dergham

1930 births
2015 deaths
Lebanese clergy
20th-century Maronite Catholic bishops
21st-century Maronite Catholic bishops